Washington SyCip Park is a privately owned public park near Greenbelt mall in Legaspi Village, Makati, Metro Manila, Philippines. The park opened in 2006, and was named after Filipino accountant and banker Washington SyCip. In addition to many indigenous tropical trees and plants, the park contains gazebos and recreational spaces.

The park is open daily from 06:00 to 22:00 PST (GMT+8). It is a no-smoking, no pet zone.

Location
Washington SyCip Park is rectangular in form, bounded by Legazpi Street to the north, Gamboa Street to the south, Rada Street to the west, and the Corinthian Plaza carpark to the east. It is close to Greenbelt shopping centre, the Asian Institute of Management, Legazpi Active Park and Union Church of Manila.

History
Washington SyCip Park was created in 2006 by Ayala Land. The park was presented to SyCip in June 2006 (his 85th birthday), in recognition of his outstanding contributions to the Philippine business community.

The park was developed jointly by Ayala Land Incorporated, the Makati Commercial Estate Association (MACEA), the City of Makati, Barangay San Lorenzo, and Washington SyCip's SyCip Gorres Velayo & Co., the largest accounting and consulting firm in the Philippines. The headquarters of MACEA is located in the northern edge of the park.

In 2017, the park underwent a seven-month renovation which was finished in December.

Sculptures
A number of sculptures by Filipino sculptor and artist Impy Pilapil can be found in the park. These include:
 Wishing Stone - a wishing stone, with a twig quill and water reservoir, which people can write their wishes on.
 Faith - an obelisk-like white, stone sculpture with a pointed edge aiming for the heavens.
 Entry - a Stonehenge-style gate made of white stone.
 Sungka - a traditional Filipino board game played with shells.
 The Mangrove Nature Embrace - a colourful framework, with blue as the dominant colour, made of steel pipes.  
 Stone turtles: - a Chinese symbol of long life, stone turtles can be found at the northern and southern entrances to the park.
 Giant urns: - giant stone urns flank one gateway of the park, probably a throwback to SyCip’s childhood years in Shanghai. In his biography, SyCip recounted that similar huge jars were found in his family garden and he used to peek at the fish swimming inside them.

Gallery

See also
 List of parks in Manila

References

External links

Parks in Makati
2006 establishments in the Philippines
Privately owned public spaces